Sheikh Mohammad Fateh al Masri was a leader of al-Qaeda in Afghanistan and Pakistan, referred to by the group as Khorasan, who replaced Mustafa Abu al-Yazid after the latter was killed in May 2010. On September 28 of the same year, it was reported that Sheikh Fateh al Masri was killed by a US drone attack in North Waziristan, Pakistan.

References

Jihadist works
2010 deaths